Geoffrey Gunter (30 April 1876 – 17 September 1961) was a Jamaican cricketer. He played in two first-class matches for the Jamaican cricket team in 1905/06.

See also
 List of Jamaican representative cricketers

References

External links
 

1876 births
1961 deaths
Jamaican cricketers
Jamaica cricketers
Sportspeople from Kingston, Jamaica